Taras Mychalewych (born December 12, 1945) is a sculptor, mosaicist, photographer, and writer.

Life and art
Taras Mychalewych was born in Munich, Germany, at the end of World War II. His family emigrated to the United States in 1949, and settled in St. Paul, Minnesota. Mychalewych attended the School of Applied Arts in St. Paul, and graduated from the Pennsylvania Academy of the Fine Arts in Philadelphia.

As a young artist, he was influenced by, among others,  Amedeo Modigliani, Egon Schiele, and Salvador Dalí. He currently lives in New Mexico.

Exhibitions
Mychalewych has had two exhibitions to date:
Group shows at the Pennsylvania Academy of the Fine Arts, Philadelphia
Solo exhibit at the Ukrainian Educational and Cultural Center, Philadelphia 1994

External links
The Main Realm

1945 births
Living people
Pennsylvania Academy of the Fine Arts alumni
German sculptors
German male sculptors
20th-century American sculptors
21st-century American sculptors